Punnoose is the Syriac-Malayalam version of Stephen. Derived from Esthapannose , another less used variant of it is Pannose. As a first name not often used recently, it is often mistaken as a surname due to the practice of many Syriac Christians of Keralam using their father's first name as their surname in modern times. Notable people who use it as a surname include:

 Jacob Punnoose, police official
 Jijo Punnoose, Indian film director, producer and actor
 Maliampurackal Chacko Punnoose (1924–2012), Indian film producer, director, and entrepreneur
 P.T. Punnoose (1911–1971), Indian politician
 Rosamma Punnoose (1913–2013), Indian independence activist, politician, and lawyer